February 14 is a 2005 Indian Tamil-language romantic comedy film directed by debutant S. P. Hosimin. Produced by Sri Saravanaa  Creations, the film stars Bharath and Renuka Menon, whilst its soundtrack was composed by Bharadwaj. Having proved his acting skills in Kaadhal (2004), Bharath has yet again given a matured performance. The movie received positive reviews but was a box office failure.

Plot
Shiva enters into St.Peters college, Bangalore and meets Pooja, who was born and brought up in the United States and has come to India to stay with her grandparents while completing her college education. Shiva falls in love with her but soon realises that their characters are totally different. Pooja feels alone, like a fish out of water in India and she wants to return to the US. So Shiva thinks about a  plan to get her to stay and he expresses his love to her by creating a fictitious character MR X but never reveals about the character till the end.  Pooja who got impressed by MR X refuses to see him in the later stage but understand and accepts Shiva's true love.

Cast

Bharath as Shiva / Mr. X
Renuka Menon as Pooja
Vadivelu as Ezhumalai, Canteen owner
Sathyan as Arvind Swamy
Santhanam as College Student
Suman Setty as Suman
Nancy Jennifer as Gayathri 
Pyramid Natarajan as Pooja's grandfather
Ajmal Ameer as College Student
Mayilsamy as Himself
Bonda Mani as Canteen employee
Halwa Vasu as Canteen employee
Vengal Rao as Canteen employee
Ragasya as Special appearance

Soundtrack

The music was composed by Bharadwaj.

References

External links

2005 films
2005 romantic comedy films
Indian romantic comedy films
2000s Tamil-language films
Films scored by Bharadwaj (composer)